Gallatin School is a historic school building located at Uniontown, Fayette County, Pennsylvania. It was built in 1908, and is a tall two-story, seven-by-eight-bay Classical Revival style building.  It is built of buff-colored brick and features a terra cotta portico with Corinthian order columns and pediment.  The interior features an octagonal central atrium.  A rear addition was built in 1927.

It was added to the National Register of Historic Places in 1998.

References

School buildings on the National Register of Historic Places in Pennsylvania
Colonial Revival architecture in Pennsylvania
School buildings completed in 1908
Schools in Fayette County, Pennsylvania
Uniontown, Pennsylvania
National Register of Historic Places in Fayette County, Pennsylvania
1908 establishments in Pennsylvania